Dashijie is a station on Shanghai Metro Line 8 and Line 14. It began operation on 29 December 2007 and became an interchange station with Line 14 on 30 December 2021. The shortest distance between two stations on the Shanghai Metro system is that between Dashijie and People's Square. The station in linked to an underground shopping complex containing a McDonald's and other fast food outlets. The station is named after the Great World entertainment complex (in Chinese, "Da Shijie"), traditionally Shanghai's largest amusement arcade.

Station Layout

Attractions and landmarks nearby 
Great World
Shanghai Concert Hall
Saint Joseph's Church, Shanghai

Railway stations in Shanghai
Line 8, Shanghai Metro
Shanghai Metro stations in Huangpu District
Railway stations in China opened in 2007
Line 14, Shanghai Metro